The 1998–99 Czech First League, known as the Gambrinus liga for sponsorship reasons, was the sixth season of top-tier football in the Czech Republic. The season started on 2 August 1998.

League changes

Relegated to the 1998–99 Czech 2. Liga
 České Budějovice (15th)
 Lázně Bohdaneč (16th)

Promoted from the 1997–98 Czech 2. Liga
 Blšany (1st)
 Karviná (2nd)

Stadia and locations

League table

Results

Top goalscorers

See also
 1998–99 Czech Cup
 1998–99 Czech 2. Liga

References

  ČMFS statistics

Czech First League seasons
Czech
1998–99 in Czech football